Luka Lakvekheliani (born 20 October 1998) is a Georgian professional footballer who plays for Dinamo Tbilisi.

Career statistics
.

References

 
 

1998 births
Footballers from Tbilisi
Living people
Footballers from Georgia (country)
Georgia (country) youth international footballers
Georgia (country) under-21 international footballers
Association football defenders
FC Saburtalo Tbilisi players
Mezőkövesdi SE footballers
FC Dinamo Tbilisi players
Erovnuli Liga players
Nemzeti Bajnokság I players
Expatriate footballers in Hungary
Expatriate footballers from Georgia (country)
Expatriate sportspeople from Georgia (country) in Hungary